The Church of St. John the Martyr was a  Roman Catholic parish church in the Roman Catholic Archdiocese of New York, located at 250 East 72nd Street, Upper East Side, Manhattan, New York City, New York.

History
The parish was established in 1903 by the Rev. John T. Prout for the Bohemian Catholics in the neighborhood of East 72nd Street. In 1903, Archbishop John Cardinal Farley bought a house for $13,000 ($ in current dollar terms) at 249 East 71st Street as a residence for Fr. Prout. It was fitted up as a chapel and the newly appointed pastor celebrated the parish’s first mass there on September 20, 1903. This served until September 25, 1904, when the Knox Memorial Presbyterian Church at 250 East 72nd Street was purchased for $39,000 ($ and refitted for the use of St. John’s congregation. The Order of Carmelites appointed to run the parish in 2007.

Buildings
The former Knox Presbyterian Church, at 252 East 72nd Street, was purchased September 25, 1904 for $39,000 and refitted as a Catholic church that year. The building had been built 1887 to the designs of notable Protestant ecclesiastical architect Robert Henderson Robertson

Artifacts
"Among the paintings presented to the church are the "Three Marys at the Tomb of Christ" (valued at $10,000) by Albert Zimmermann and "St. John Nepomucene" by Alphonse Mucha. The chime of ten bells was a personal gift to Father Prout from Christian Young, a banker and a Lutheran, and was rung for the first time at New Year's 1905. At the Christmas Mass in the same year, the Bohemian violinist, Kubelik, played."
"The church possesses a reliquary containing more than 60 precious relics, secured  from a noble family in Rome. the certificate is signed by Cardinal Patrizzi, and the collection is said to be one of the most valuable in the archdiocese. The catholic population numbers about 4,000. The records for 1913 show 408 baptisms and 105 marriages. The church property is valued at $92,000, with a debt of $52,500. Father Prout is assisted by Revs. Joseph Parker and Joseph Debal."

Pastors
1903: Rev. Father John T. Prout was born in New York on May 9, 1875, of Bohemian parents; educated in the parochial schools, at St. Mary’s College (North East, Pa.), St. Joseph's Seminary (Troy), St. Joseph's Seminary (Dunwoodie), and New York University; and ordained in St. Patrick’s Cathedral on June 1, 1901. He served at St. Paul's Church (Congers, New York), and then as assistant at St. Monica’s Church (New York City), where he attended the Bohemians of the neighborhood. In 1914, it was reported "Agnostic influences are very strong there in the parish, but Father Prout receives hearty support from many of the best known Bohemian families and also from alumnae of the Sacred Heart Convent (Madison Avenue), and others. In 1909, though the efforts of Father Prout, the Austrian Immigrant Home was established at 170 East 80th Street. Later, it was moved to 84 Broad Street."

February 1918: Fr. John Lane
1935: Msgr. Larkin
1950: Rev. Edward McGrath
1961: Msgr. James Nash
March 1964: Msgr. Stanislaus McGovern
December 1969: Msgr. Daniel Donovan
1984: Rev. Walter Niebrzydowski
July 1996: Msgr. John Woolsey
2007: The Order of Carmelites appointed to run the parish.
2015: Church was closed

Closing
In 2015 this church was closed and merged into the churches of St. John Nepomucene and St. Frances Xavier Cabrini (Roosevelt Island) as part of the Archdiocese of New York's many closings and mergers of 2015. Only St. John Nepomucene and St. Frances Xavier Cabrini remained open for regular Masses and other events. This combined parish of East River Catholic churches is called the Church of St. John Nepomucene, St. Frances Xavier Cabrini & St. John the Martyr.  On June 30, 2017, the church was deconsecrated.  As of 2018, the building was sold and demolished.

References

External links

 Official webpage

Christian organizations established in 1907
Former Presbyterian churches in New York City
Romanesque Revival church buildings in New York City
Roman Catholic churches completed in 1887
Czech-American culture in New York City
Upper East Side
1907 establishments in New York City
Roman Catholic
19th-century Roman Catholic church buildings in the United States